Hussein Badreddin al-Houthi (20 August 1959 – 10 September 2004), also spelled Hussein Badr Eddin al-Houthi, was a Yemeni Zaidi religious, political and military leader, as well as former member of the Yemeni parliament for the Al-Haqq party between 1993 and 1997. He was instrumental in the Houthi insurgency against the Yemeni government, which began in 2004. Al-Houthi, who was a one-time rising political aspirant in Yemen, had wide religious and tribal backing in northern Yemen's mountainous regions. The Houthi movement took his name after his assassination in 2004.

Early life
Al-Houthi was born in 1956 or 1959 in the Marran area of Sada'a region. His father, Badr al-Din, was a prominent Zaydi cleric who briefly took control of the Houthi movement after his son's death.

According to a disciple, al-Houthi lived part of his life with his family, including his father and his younger brother, Abd al-Malik, in Qom, Iran. The disciple also claimed that al-Houthi had close relationships with Ali Khamenei, Supreme Leader of Iran, and Hassan Nasrallah, Hezbollah's leader.

Political career

Member of Al-Haqq
Al-Houthi was a member of the Yemeni Zaydi/Shafi'i political party Al-Haqq (The Truth). When the party supported South Yemeni separatism, it became a target of the government, and he fled, allegedly, to Syria and then to Iran. After his return to Yemen, he broke with Al-Haqq to form his own party.

Believing Youth movement
Al-Houthi founded the Believing Youth movement in 1990 or 1992 to teach young persons about Zaidi and its history to revive Zaidism in Saada Governorate.

Forming Ansarallah
Al-Houthi was accused by the Ali Abdullah Saleh government of trying to set himself up as an imam, of setting up unlicensed religious centres, of creating an armed group called Ansarallah and of staging violent anti-American and anti-Israeli protests, as al-Houthi's followers felt Yemen's government was too closely allied with the United States.

Death
On 18 June 2004, Yemeni police arrested 640 of his followers, who were demonstrating in front of the Great Mosque of Sana'a. Two days later the Yemeni government offered a bounty of $55,000 for his capture, launching an operation aimed at ending his alleged rebellion.

In July, Yemen Army forces killed 25 of his Houthi supporters and increased the bounty to $75,500. After months of battles between Yemeni security forces and Houthis, on 10 September the Yemeni Interior and Defense Ministries released a statement declaring that he had been killed, along with 20 of his aides, in Marran province, Saada Governorate.

Legacy
On 5 June 2013, tens of thousands of Yemeni Shias attended the reburial of the remains of al-Houthi in Sa'dah, where armed rebels were deployed in large numbers. The new Yemeni government had turned over his remains to his family on 28 December 2012 as a goodwill gesture to bolster national reconciliation talks. The previous government of Ali Abdullah Saleh, who had stepped down in 2012 after the Yemeni Revolution, originally buried al-Houthi in 2004 at the Sana'a central prison to prevent his grave from becoming a shrine for the Zaidis. A representative of Yemeni President Abdrabbuh Mansur Hadi attended the funeral, but a Houthi spokesman accused the central government of refusing to give visas to several dignitaries who wanted to travel to Yemen to attend the ceremony and of tearing down pictures of al-Houthi put up in the Yemeni capital.

The Houthis take their name from the family name al-Houthi. His brothers Abdul-Malik, Yahia, and Abdul-Karim are leaders of the rebels as were his late brothers Ibrahim and Abdulkhalik.

References

1959 births
2004 deaths
20th-century Yemeni politicians
21st-century Yemeni politicians
Assassinated Yemeni politicians
Assassinations in Yemen
Burials in Yemen
Deaths by firearm in Yemen
Houthi members
Leaders of Islamic terror groups
Members of the House of Representatives (Yemen)
People from Saada Governorate
Yemeni expatriates in Iran
Yemeni military personnel killed in action
Yemeni Zaydis
Zaidiyyah scholars
Houthi family